

Results

World Cup standings
Standings after 8 of 9 2014 UCI Women's Road World Cup races.

Individuals

Team: 
Mountain: Alena Amialiusik
Sprint: Iris Slappendel
Youth: Elena Cecchini

References

2014 in Swedish sport
2014 UCI Women's Road World Cup
Open de Suède Vårgårda